Stange Ice Shelf, is an Antarctic ice shelf in Stange Sound, English Coast, bounded to the east by Spaatz Island, to the northwest by Smyley Island, and to the west by fast ice in Carroll Inlet. Named in association with Stange Sound. In contrast to the some other ice shelves on the Antarctic Peninsula, for example the Larsen Ice Shelf, the Stange Ice Shelf has been relatively stable.

See also

 Ice shelves of Antarctica

References

Ice shelves of Antarctica
Bodies of ice of Palmer Land